Taekwondo at the 2015 Southeast Asian Games was held in Singapore EXPO Hall 2, Singapore from 12 to 14 June 2015.

Participating nations
A total of 104 athletes from 11 nations will be competing in taekwondo at the 2015 Southeast Asian Games:

Medalists

Poomsae

Men

Kyorugi

Men

Women

Results

Men

Under 54 kg

Under 58 kg

Under 63 kg

Under 68 kg

Under 74 kg

Individual Poomsae

Team Poomsae

Women

Under 46 kg

Under 49 kg

Under 53 kg

Under 57 kg
14 June Report

Under 62 kg
14 June Report

Individual Poomsae
12 June Report

Team Poomsae

Mixed

Pair Poomsae

Medal table

References

External links
  

2015
Southeast Asian Games
2015 Southeast Asian Games events